Fabulous Fox Theatre may refer to:

 Fox Theatre (Atlanta)
 Fox Theatre (St. Louis)

See also
 Fox Theatre (disambiguation)